Franco da Rocha is a train station on CPTM Line 7-Ruby, located in Franco da Rocha.

History
The original station was opened by São Paulo Railway on 1 February 1888, named Juquery. Years later, it was renamed after Francisco Franco da Rocha, doctor responsible for the opening of Juqueri hospital complex.

The new building is contemporary and adapted to people with disabilities, with tactile floor, adapted restrooms for wheelchairs, elevators and escalators.

References

Companhia Paulista de Trens Metropolitanos stations
Railway stations opened in 1888